Carmen was an American-British band active from 1970 to 1975. Their style was a fusion of rock, progressive, and flamenco music and dance. Carmen's first album, Fandangos in Space, is ranked number 46 in the Rolling Stone list of 50 Greatest Prog Rock Albums of All Time.

History
The group was founded by David Clark Allen, a Mexican/American Californian trained in flamenco guitar.  Originally a seven-member band in Los Angeles, the band relocated to London, England, in January 1973, where the personnel soon stabilized as a quintet.

In London, they became friendly with several rock stars of the time, including David Bowie - who introduced them internationally by including them on his Midnight Special '1980 Floor Show', Marc Bolan (Paul Fenton became his studio and tour drummer), and Bryan Ferry.  Obtaining the services of producer Tony Visconti, Carmen released three albums: Fandangos in Space (1973), Dancing on a Cold Wind (1974), and The Gypsies (1975). By early 1975, the band was enjoying its greatest success, playing as an opening act at concerts by Santana, Blue Öyster Cult, and Electric Light Orchestra, and touring for three months as the opener for Jethro Tull. A series of unfortunate events then occurred while the group was recording The Gypsies at Longview Farm. Paul Fenton seriously damaged his knee, stopping his career as a drummer for many years. Carmen and Tony Visconti ended their musical relationship, and the band's manager left. Carmen disbanded shortly after finishing their last album in 1975 and John Glascock went on to join Jethro Tull.

Music
Carmen's stage performances featured Amaral and Angela Allen dancing on a specially amplified stage floor, so that their flamenco zapateado became an integral percussive addition to the music. Spanish influences in their sound included acoustic guitar interludes in flamenco style, occasional Spanish lyrics, themes of betrayed love reminiscent of Federico García Lorca, and castanets, all supported by a traditional rock rhythm section.

Discography
The first two albums were re-issued by Angel Air records as a 2-CD set in October 2006. Carmen's third album The Gypsies was re-issued by Angel Air records in May 2007, also as a 2-CD set; the second CD, entitled Widescreen, contains new instrumental music by David Clark Allen.

Widescreen - the band David formed with Laurence Elliot-Potter - supported The Buena Vista Social Club, Eliades Ochoa, and Ojos de Brujo and played for many years regularly on the UK festival circuit.

 Fandangos in Space (1973)
 Dancing on a Cold Wind (1974)
 The Gypsies (1975)

Members
 David Clark Allen - lead vocals, acoustic flamenco guitars, electric guitars, synthesiser, mellotron, piano, backing vocals, lyrics (1970-1975)
 Angela Allen - lead vocals, synthesizer, mellotron, piano, backing vocals, dancer (1970-1975)
 Roberto Amaral - lead and backing vocals, lyrics, dancer (1971-1975)
 John Glascock - bass, bass pedals, synthesisers, lead and backing vocals, lyrics (1972-1975)
 Paul Fenton - drums, percussion, backing vocals (1973-1975)
 Brian Glascock - Drums (1970-1973)
 Dennis Trerotola - lead vocals (1970-1971)
 Adam Moody - guitars (1970-1971)
 Mark Moody - bass (1970-1971)
 Vicente - dancer (1970-1971)
 Rick Chavez - guitars (1971-1972)
 Mark Anthony - guitars, lyrics/music (1970-1972)
 Nigel Griggs - bass (1971-1972) Nigel also played bass guitar in the band Split Enz from 1977 to 1984 and performed in Schnell Fenster from 1986 to 1992.

References

External links

British progressive rock groups
American progressive rock groups